Kad budem mrtav i beo, is a 1967 Yugoslav film directed by Živojin Pavlović and written by Ljubiša Kozomara and Gordan Mihić. It stars the famous Serbian actors Dragan Nikolić and Ružica Sokić. It is considered by critics  to be one of the greatest achievements of the Yugoslav Black Wave. The Yugoslav Film Archive officially listed it as the second-best Yugoslav film of all time.

References

External links
 

1967 films
Yugoslav drama films
Films set in Belgrade
Films set in Serbia
Films set in Yugoslavia
Films directed by Živojin Pavlović
Yugoslav black-and-white films
Films shot in Belgrade
Yugoslav musical films